Lucy Pearman is a BAFTA nominated British comedian, actress and writer.  She was nominated for Best Newcomer in the Edinburgh Comedy Awards at the Edinburgh Fringe in 2017 for her solo show.  In July 2021 she wrote and starred in the BBC Three sitcom pilot Please Help, which was nominated for a BAFTA in 2022.

Pearman initially performed as part of a double-act called LetLuce, with Letty Butler, who she met at London Academy of Music and Dramatic Art (LAMDA) in 2007. LetLuce began when Pearman and Butler auditioned together for an advert with Steve Bendelack and he told them "write a show and get yourselves to Edinburgh"

Stand up

Pearman performed her first solo Edinburgh Fringe show in 2016.  In 2017, she was nominated for Best Newcomer in the Edinburgh Comedy Awards and in 2019 she was nominated for Best Show at the Leicester Comedy Festival Awards.

In 2018, The Scotsman described her show Fruit Loop as one of the most unusual comedy shows at the Edinburgh Fringe that year.

Her shows involve music, clowning, character comedy, surrealism, audience interaction, props and puns.

Television

She has acted on TV since 2009, appearing in The Mind of Herbert Clunkerdunk, Mr Winner and The Bill, has acted in several short films, as well as writing and producing the short film The Baby.
She also guest starred in the  2020 Red Dwarf special Red Dwarf: The Promised Land as Sister Peanut.

In May 2021 the BBC announced a pilot, Please Help, written by and starring Pearman, which aired in July 2021 on BBC Three.  The show centres on Pearman's character, Milly, a full-time carer who gains super powers.

In 2022, Pearman appeared in series 2 of The Mind of Herbert Clunkerdunk on BBC 2, reprising her role as Bobby Kindle. In September 2022 she starred alongside Kiell Smith-Bynoe and Tim Key in online sitcom, The Train, which she also wrote.

Radio and podcast

In 2018 she appeared on BBC Radio 4 in series 4 of Tim Key's Late Night Poetry Programme.

She has appeared in the podcast series Funny from the Fringe, Secret Artists with Annie McGrath and Birthday Girls House Party.

Pearman's favourite comedy includes Camping, Brian Gittins and The Royle Family.

Live shows

2019 – Baggage
2018 – Fruit Loop
2017 – Maid of Cabbage
2016 – Crack in Progress

See also
Spencer Jones
Tim Key
Lou Sanders

References

Living people
Year of birth missing (living people)